Black Cobra may refer to:

 A type of cobra native to South Asia
 Black Cobra (band), American heavy metal band
 Black Cobra (film series), Italian action film series
 Black Cobra (gang), Danish immigrant street gang

Buy Online Black Cobra Tablets